Franco Godi (born 10 June 1940) is an Italian composer, conductor, arranger and record producer.

Born in Milan, Godi grew up in Prato where he started his musical activity as the member of a band. After working in a local radio station, in 1962 he composed his first jingle for the Bertolli oil, and from then he became the most active composer in the field of commercials and Caroselli in Italy, as to be called "Mr. Jingle".

Godi was also active as a film score composer, particularly in the field of animation where he had a long collaboration with Bruno Bozzetto, and also composed theme songs for a large number of television programs and series. He is the founder of the record label  Best Sound, which produced some of the early hip hop Italian groups, including Articolo 31 and Gemelli Diversi.

Discography

Filmography

References

External links 
 

 Franco Godi at Discogs

1940 births
Italian film score composers
Italian male film score composers
Musicians from Milan
Italian male conductors (music)
Italian music arrangers
Italian record producers
Living people
Hip hop record producers
21st-century Italian conductors (music)
21st-century Italian male musicians